Harry V. Jump (November 7, 1914 – February 14, 1989) was a former member of the Ohio Senate. He served the 13th District from 1967 to 1968. Jump resigned midway throughout his term to serve under Ohio Governor Jim Rhodes.  He was succeeded by Robert J. Corts He later served as Senate Clerk, then Insurance Director under Jim Rhodes in the seventies. He died at his home in Willard, Ohio, on February 14, 1989, of an apparent heart attack.

References

1914 births
Republican Party Ohio state senators
Politicians from Cincinnati
1989 deaths
20th-century American politicians
Bluffton University alumni
People from Willard, Ohio